is a Japanese anime adaptation of the SD Gundam model kit series BB Senshi Sangokuden produced by Sunrise.  Loosely based on the classic 14th century Chinese historical novel, Romance of the Three Kingdoms, with characters being personifications of various mobile suits from the Gundam franchise, the show first premiered in Japanese theaters as a 15-minute short film titled  on February 27, 2010.  The broadcast of the television series followed two months later on TXN stations on April 3, 2010. It was directed by Kenichi Suzuki and Kunihiro Mori, and ran for 51 episodes.

Plot

TV series

Long ago, Three Sovereigns descended from the heavens onto the land of Militia. According to legend, the Three Sovereigns used their powers to bring order to the land. One became the Sun and bathed the world with its sunlight. One became the Moon and healed the world with its moonlight. One became the sea and nurtured the world with its waters. It is foretold that a time of strife shall arrive.

"When Militia is shrouded in darkness, the souls of the Three Sovereigns shall be entrusted to the Gundams. Only with guidance from the Gyokuji, shall they exorcise the land from darkness..." - Militia Legend, "G Records"-

That time of strife will be known as Sangokuden, and that time has come upon us.

Movie
Chō Denei-ban SD Gundam Sangokuden Brave Battle Warriors is a special movie episode that screened with the fifth Sgt. Frog (Keroro Gunsō) film, Keroro Gunso the Super Movie: Creation! Ultimate Keroro, Wonder Space-Time Island.  The story is set chronologically during episode 4 of the SD Gundam Sangokuden Brave Battle Warriors anime series, after Toutaku has Reitei assassinated, and before Sousou tries to assassinate Toutaku.

Characters

Note: This cast list is still incomplete.

The following are the main characters that appear in the anime. They are grouped according to different factions/teams/armies: Ryuubi, Sousou, Sonken, Ryofu, Toutaku, Enshou, Enjyutsu, and Others.

Ryuubi Faction (劉備の仲間)

Sousou Faction (曹操の仲間)

Sonken Faction (孫権の仲間)

Ryofu Team (呂布隊)

Toutaku Faction (董卓の仲間)

Enshou Army (袁紹軍)

Enjyutsu Army (袁術軍)

Others (その他)

Music
The show does not feature an opening vocal theme song. However, there two ending theme songs. The first ending theme, is performed by Ko-saku. This is the same theme song that has been featured in promotional animation for the BB Senshi Sangokuden model kit series. The second ending theme, which is used from episode 27 onwards, is performed by Ryuubi (Yūki Kaji), Kan-u (Hiroki Yasumoto), Chouhi (Masayuki Kato), Sousou (Kenji Nomura) and Sonken (Nobunaga Shimazaki).

References

External links
 Official SD Gundam Sangokuden Brave Battle Warriors website
 
 
 Official Chō Denei-ban SD Gundam Sangokuden Brave Battle Warriors website

Sunrise (company)
2010 anime films